The 1965–66 Cypriot First Division was the 27th season of the Cypriot top-level football league.

Overview
It was contested by 11 teams, and AC Omonia won the championship.

League standings

Results

References
Cyprus - List of final tables (RSSSF)

Cypriot First Division seasons
Cypriot
1